José Quirino (born 19 April 1968) is a Mexican former professional boxer who competed from 1986 to 1997. He held the WBO super flyweight title in 1992.

Professional career
He was not a hard puncher, so José won many of his fights with his speed.

WBO Super Flyweight Championship
Quirino won the WBO super flyweight championship by upsetting Puerto Rico's José Ruíz Matos in The Aladdin, Las Vegas, Nevada.

On September 4, 1992 he lost his championship against an undefeated Johnny Bredahl in a very disputed twelve-round decision, in Copenhagen.

Legacy
Jose was undefeated at 16-0 until he lost his 17th professional fight against Tony "the bazooka" Luca in a highly disputed ten-round fight. José has losses to some of boxing's best fighters like Danny Romero, Michael Carbajal, Mark Johnson, Junior Jones, and Johnny Bredahl. Jose was also nominated as the rookie of the year for Mexico in 1986.

See also
List of Mexican boxing world champions
List of WBO world champions
List of super flyweight boxing champions

References

External links

Boxers from Baja California
Sportspeople from Tijuana
World boxing champions
World Boxing Organization champions
World super-flyweight boxing champions
Super-flyweight boxers
1968 births
Living people
Mexican male boxers